(surname often written as Kamata) was a vice-admiral of the Imperial Japanese Navy who saw service in the Pacific Theatre of World War II.

Biography
Kamada was a native of Ehime prefecture in Shikoku island, Japan. He graduated from the 39th class of the Imperial Japanese Naval Academy in 1911, ranked 95th out of a class of 148. His classmates included future admirals Takeo Takagi, Chuichi Hara, Shigeyoshi Miwa, and Sadamichi Kajioka. He was promoted to lieutenant in 1918, serving first on the battleship  before being assigned to the survey ships Musashi and Yamato. He became chief gunnery officer on the battleship  in February 1924. After his promotion to lieutenant commander in December 1924, he served on the cruisers  and  before receiving his first command — the destroyer  — on 30 November 1929.

After his promotion to commander in December 1930, Kamada served as executive officer on the battleship  from November 1934. He was promoted to captain in November 1935, and became captain of the cruiser . Appointed to the Imperial Japanese Navy General Staff from October 1940, he was stationed on Japanese-occupied Hainan island.

Kamada was promoted to rear admiral on 15 October 1941. He served on the staff and commanded forces of the Japanese 8th Fleet in New Guinea from October 1942-December 1943. On 23 August 1944, Kamada took command of Japanese naval forces, designated the 22nd Naval Special Base Force, based in Balikpapan, Borneo, making him the military governor of Dutch Borneo. Kamada's forces were subsequently involved in the Borneo Campaign of 1945. He was promoted to vice admiral on 1 May 1945.

Surrender and execution
Kamada surrendered his forces to Australian Major General Edward James Milford aboard  on 8 September 1945.

After the surrender of Japan, a Dutch military court in Pontianak convicted him of war crimes for the executions of 1,500 west Borneo natives in 1944 and the ill treatment of 2,000 Dutch POWs held on Flores Island. Kamada was sentenced to death and was executed by hanging on 18 October 1947.

References

Notes

1890 births
1947 deaths
Military personnel from Ehime Prefecture
Japanese admirals of World War II
Imperial Japanese Navy admirals
Japanese mass murderers
Japanese people executed for war crimes
Japanese people executed abroad
Executed military leaders
People executed by the Netherlands by hanging
Executed mass murderers